Bryan Andrés Segura Cruz (born 14 January 1997) is a Costa Rican football goalkeeper who plays for Liga FPD club Herediano.

Segura has never been capped, but has been benched four times for Costa Rica U20, at the 2017 FIFA U-20 World Cup, and seven times for Costa Rica, including at the 2019 CONCACAF Gold Cup.

Career

Segura started his career with Pérez Zeledón.

References

1997 births
Living people
Costa Rican footballers
Association football goalkeepers
2019 CONCACAF Gold Cup players
Municipal Pérez Zeledón footballers
C.S. Herediano footballers
Liga FPD players